Talkh ol Naqi (also Romanized as Talkh ol Naqī) is a village in Torqabeh Rural District, Torqabeh District, Torqabeh and Shandiz County, Razavi Khorasan Province, Iran. At the 2006 census, its population was 45, in 11 families.

References 

Populated places in Torqabeh and Shandiz County